The Global mobile Suppliers Association (GSA) is a not-for-profit industry organisation representing suppliers in the mobile communication industry.
GSA actively promotes 3GPP technology such as 3G; 4G; 5G.
GSA is a market representation partner in 3GPP and co-operates with organisations including COAI, ETSI, GSMA, ICU, ITU, European Conference of Postal and Telecommunications Administrations (CEPT-ECC), other regional regulatory bodies and other industry associations.

The GSA Spectrum Group is a large industry advocacy team of more than 185 participants from GSA Executive Member companies formed into 7 regional and country teams and other focused groups. GSA actively cooperates on spectrum related promotion with the GSM Association (GSMA), another organization with similar stated goals representing the mobile network operator community. GSA is also an Associate Member of APT (Asia region), ATU (Africa) and CITEL (LatAm & USA/Canada).

GAMBoD 
The GSA analyser for mobile broadband data (GAMBoD) is a search and analysis tool developed by GSA to enable searches of mobile devices and new global data on mobile broadband networks, technologies and spectrum (NTS), mobile chipsets, Mobile Operators, Fixed Wireless devices, and Private Mobile Networks. The Devices database can be searched by supplier, form factor, features, peak downlink and uplink speeds, and operating frequency. The NTS database can be searched by mobile broadband (MBB) technology, feature, UE category, downlink speed, spectrum bands used and can be segmented by region.

Special Interest Groups and Forums 
In 2021 GSA established the 4G-5G Fixed Wireless Access Forum to promote this segment of the mobile industry. The forum has over 50 Members and Observers and produces ecosystem reports and bi-annual plenaries to showcase Fixed Wireless (FWA) deployments. 
The Private Mobile Networks (PMN) Special Interest Group (SIG) has been established to track and report on deployments of non-public mobile networks, in enterprises and industries. 
To join either of the above groups, companies can contact GSA at

Research areas 
GSA produces around 140 industry reports, white-papers, presentations, charts and industry snapshots each year based on the data from its GAMBoD databases. Many reports are free to download once registered and logged into the web site. More detailed reports are available for Members and Associates.

Areas of research include:
 4G-5G Ecosystem
 Spectrum, networks and technologies
 Fixed Wireless Access
 Private Mobile Networks
 NB-IoT and LTE-M
 VoLTE and ViLTE
 eMBMS
 C-V2X

Membership 
Executive Members
 Apple
 Ericsson
 Huawei
 Intel
 MediaTek
 Nokia
 Qualcomm
 Samsung
 ZTE
Members
 Queen's University Belfast, Centre for Wireless Innovation
 Casa Systems
 Interdigital
 Keysight Technologies
 Viavi

Associates - ~85 including

 Analysys Mason
 Boston Consulting Group
 ComReg
 CTIA
 Doro AB
 HP Enterprises
 IFT (Instituto Federal de Telecomunicaciones)
 ITU (International Telecommunication Union)
 LGS Innovations
 Mavenir
 Microsoft
 Ofcom
 Plum Consulting
 Quectel
 Rohde & Schwarz
 Sony
 Syniverse
 Vodacom SA

See also
Supplier association

References

External links
Official website

GSM standard
UMTS
Telecommunications organizations
Mobile phone industry